Aadi Lakshmi Puraana is a 2019 Indian Kannada-language romantic comedy film written and directed by V. Priya and produced by Rockline Venkatesh under his banner Rockline Entertainment Pvt Ltd. The film starring Radhika Pandit and Nirup Bhandari, set against the backdrop of a drug bust, is a story of Aadityaa (played by Nirup Bhandari), an investigation officer, and Lakshmi (played by Radhika Pandit), a happy-go-lucky girl in a travel agency, and their chance meeting. The film theatrically released on 19 July 2019 and now it is available on Amazon Prime Video.

Premise
Aaditya aka Aadi is an undercover cop in the NCB, who is on a mission to bust down drug peddlers in Bangalore. He believes in Love at first sight. Lakshmi is a travel agent, who is keen on bringing her travel agency to greater heights, but is an untrustful person, who always cook up lies for some reasons. When the two meet each other, she lies that she is married and has a 7-year-old daughter and her husband had left for another woman. Despite this, Aadi decide to accept Lakshmi. How does Aadi completes his mission and what would be his reaction when Lakshmi's inferiority complex (untrustfulness) gets exposed forms the rest of the plot.

Cast
 Nirup Bhandari as Aaditya
 Radhika Pandit as Lakshmi
 Tara as Shanthamma
 Suchendra Prasad as Ramegowda
 Yashwanth Shetty as Eashwer
 Bharath Kalyan as Ravi
 Sowmya Jaganmurthy as Savitha
 Joe Simon
 Vishal Nayer as Chaddha
 Krishna Nadig
 Deepak Shetty
 Nawab Shah
 Maghu Hegde

Soundtrack 

The music is composed by Anup Bhandari, on his own lyrics.

References

External links
 

2019 films
Indian romantic comedy films
Indian films about revenge
2010s Kannada-language films
2019 romantic comedy films
Rockline Entertainments films